The 2010 Carlisle City Council election took place on 6 May 2010 to elect members of Carlisle District Council in Cumbria, England. One third of the council was up for election and the council stayed under no overall control.

After the election, the composition of the council was:
Labour 23
Conservative 22
Liberal Democrats 5
Independent 2

Background
Before the election Labour were the largest party with 23 councillors, compared to 21 Conservatives, 7 Liberal Democrats and 1 independent. However the council was run by a coalition between the Conservatives and Liberal Democrats.

18 seats were being contested at the election by a total of 68 candidates. Both the Conservative and Labour parties stood in all 18 seats, while there were 10 Liberal Democrat candidates, 9 British National Party, 6 Green Party, 5 Trade Unionist and Socialist Coalition, 1 UK Independence Party and 1 independent. The Socialist and Trade Union candidates included 2 former Labour mayors, Craig Johnston and John Metcalfe, while the independent Robert Betton had won Botcherby on Cumbria County Council at the 2009 election and was facing the same Labour opponent, Anne Glendinning, as in 2009.

Election result
No party won a majority, with Labour remaining the largest party on 23 seats, but the Conservatives gained a seat to move to 22 councillors. The Liberal Democrats lost 2 seats to drop to 5 councillors, while a second independent councillor was elected to the council. Overall turnout at the election was 64.5%, up from 38.1% in 2008. This was as the election took place at the same time as the general election, where Conservative John Stevenson gained Carlisle constituency from Labour by 853 votes.

Labour gained Morton from the Liberal Democrats, defeating the Liberal Democrat group leader Peter Farmer, who announced his retirement from politics after his defeat. However Labour fell 14 votes short of taking Castle from the Liberal Democrats and lost Botcherby to independent Robert Betton. Meanwhile, the Conservatives gained Dalston from the Liberal Democrats, after the sitting Liberal Democrat councillor Steven Tweedie stepped down at the election.

Following the election Reg Watson became the new leader of the Labour group on the council, as Michael Boaden had stepped down after being defeated as Labour candidate at the general election. Conservative Mike Mitchelson, who held his seat at the election, was re-elected as leader of the council, continuing the alliance with the Liberal Democrats.

Ward results

By-elections between 2010 and 2011

A by-election was held on 16 September 2010 for Stanwix Urban, after John Stevenson resigned from the council on being elected as a Member of Parliament. The seat was held for the Conservatives by Paul Nedved with a majority of 400 over Labour.

References

2010 English local elections
May 2010 events in the United Kingdom
2010
2010s in Cumbria